The 28th Gran Premio del Mugello (Mugello Grand Prix), was the fifth round of the 1984 European Championship for F2 Drivers, with the winner receiving the Trofeo Banca Toscana. This was held at the Autodromo Internazionale del Mugello, in the Tuscany Region of Italy, on 19 May.

Report

Entry
Just like the previous round at Vallelunga, a total of 25 F2 cars were entered for the event, but come qualifying the field was down to just 17 cars.

Qualifying
Christian Danner took pole position for PMC Motorsport / BS Automotive in their March-BMW 842, averaging a speed of 117.976 mph.

Race
The race was held over 42 laps of the Mugello circuit. Mike Thackwell took the winner spoils for works Ralt team, driving their Ralt-Honda RH6. The Kiwi won in a time of 1hr 13:38.89mins., averaging a speed of 111.515 mph. Second place went to the Martini Racing, France/ORECA entered Martini-BMW 001  of Michel Ferté, who was exactly 80 seconds behind. The podium was completed by the PMC Motorsport / BS Automotive March of Christian Danner, was only 2.04 seconds adrift.

Classification

Race Result

 Fastest lap: Mike Thackwell, 1:43.92secs. (112.923 mph)

References

Mugello
Mugello
Gran Premio di Mugello